Herald Franklin Stout (June 6, 1903 – March 23, 1987) was an admiral in the United States Navy who served in World War II and Korea.

Early life and career
Herald F. Stout was born June 15, 1903, in Dover, Ohio to Franklin Lee and Jemima Mae Tong Stout. After graduating as valedictorian of Roosevelt High School, he entered the United States Naval Academy on appointment from the Sixteenth District of Ohio in 1922. Stout graduated and was commissioned an ensign on June 3, 1926. On the same day, he married his hometown sweetheart, Louise Frederica Finley. They were the parents of three sons.

Following graduation, Stout joined the USS Cincinnati as a main engine division officer, communications officer, radio officer, ship's secretary, and then finally as a gun division officer. Upon detachment from the Cincinnati in June 1931 and subsequent to promotion to lieutenant, Stout had a year's duty as a torpedo and communications Officer aboard the destroyer USS Breckenridge. In June 1932, he was transferred to the destroyer USS Hatfield to serve as torpedo officer and first lieutenant until April 1933.

In September 1942, Stout became commissioning commanding officer of the destroyer USS Claxton, which operated with Destroyer Squadron 23 ("Little Beaver" Squadron) in the Solomon Islands. For outstanding service in command of the Claxton, he was awarded two Navy Crosses.

In January 1952, he became Commander, Mine Squadron THREE, Commander, Western Pacific Minesweeping Force and Commander, Task Group 95.6, operating in the Korean area of hostilities.

After Naval retirement, Rear Admiral Stout was a senior Reliability Design Engineer with Convair Corporation, who produced the Atlas missile, and later a Reliability Engineer with Astronautics, both Divisions of General Dynamics Corporation. Ten years following the death of Louise Frederica Stout, he married Zoe E. Anderson on July 25, 1976, in the church where they met and worked together. Rear Admiral Stout was a Brother of the Fraternity of Free and Accepted Masons. He was a charter and continuing member of the United Church of Christ of La Mesa, California when he died on March 23, 1987.

Awards 
In addition to the Navy Cross with gold star, the Distinguished Service Medal, the Silver Star Medal, and the Presidential Unit Citation Ribbon, Rear Admiral Stout was awarded the Second Nicaraguan Campaign Medal, the Yangtze Service Medal, the American Defense Service Medal with star, the American Campaign Medal, the Asiatic-Pacific Campaign Medal with one silver star and two bronze stars (seven engagements), the World War II Victory Medal, the Navy Occupation Service Medal with Asia Clasp, the China Service Medal, the National Defense Service Medal with one bronze star, the Pearl Harbor Commemorative Medal, the Korean Service Medal, the United Nations Service Medal, the Philippine Liberation Ribbon, and the Korean Presidential Unit Citation.

Navy Cross citation

Legacy
The destroyer USS Stout was named for Stout in 1992.

References

1903 births
1987 deaths
United States Navy admirals
United States Navy personnel of World War II
United States Navy personnel of the Korean War
Recipients of the Navy Cross (United States)
People from Dover, Ohio
Military personnel from Ohio